Salvage Code Red is a National Geographic Channel TV series that charts the work of rival groups of marine salvage experts.

Background
Emergency marine salvage is one of the most dangerous jobs in the world. There are over 500 serious shipwreck incidents reported annually - from explosions and fires on oil tankers, to ships wrecked by storms, to head-on collisions between ships. Of these around 250-300 result in major salvage operations every year.

The Show
The show highlights the work of two marine salvage companies, Smit and Titan.

The Salvors
Smit, which is one of the salvage companies featured in National Geographic’s ‘Salvage Code Red,’ is one of the oldest salvage rescue companies in the world, with more than 165 years of service in the maritime sector. Over the years it has worked all over the globe on many sizes of vessels. But while the company may be best known for its part in salvaging the MS Riverdance ferry in Blackpool in 2008, featured in an upcoming episode of Salvage Code Red, Smit also responds to smaller, but no less dangerous and technically complicated, salvage operations every month.

Titan, along with Rotterdam-based Smit, which also features in Salvage Code Red, is today one of the biggest marine salvage companies in the world, but started out back in the 1980s as a one-tug towing firm. It was only after working on a successful salvage operation in the Caribbean in 1982 that the company quickly expanded to take on additional barges, tugs and cranes and focus on marine salvage operations. Today, Titan is the US Coast Guard’s main salvage contractor in Mississippi and much of the Gulf of Mexico and in the aftermath of Hurricane Katrina in 2005, successfully re-floated no less than 65 vessels.

References

External links
 

National Geographic (American TV channel) original programming